Dmitry Sergeyevich Sipyagin ( – ) was a Russian politician.

Political career
Born in Kiev, Sipyagin graduated from the Judicial Department of St Petersburg University in 1876. Served in the MVD as Vice Governor of Kharkov (1886–1888), Governor of Courland (1888–1891) and Governor of Moscow (1891–1893). Deputy of the Minister of State Property (1893); Deputy of the Minister of Interior (1894); Executive Director on the petitions of the Imperial Chancellery (1895–1899); Director of the Ministry of Interior (1899); Minister of Interior (1899).

In 1899, during the Russian Student Strike, the government had given Sipyagin "the power of imposing military service as a punishment for acts of civil disobedience towards the University authorities, and themselves to appoint special committees, or rather Courts nominated ad hoc..."  He remained the interior minister from 20 October 1899 to 2 April 1902.

He was assassinated in the Mariinsky Palace by Socialist-Revolutionary Stepan Balmashov. His death was a severe setback to Sergei Witte, the finance minister, who had been supported by Sipyagin but would be challenged by his successor, Vyacheslav von Plehve.

Honours
Sipyagin received the Order of Saint Vladimir as an Imperial favour for the New Year 1900, shortly after accepting the position as Minister.

References

1853 births
1902 deaths
Assassinated politicians of the Russian Empire
Burials at Tikhvin Cemetery
Members of the State Council (Russian Empire)
Politicians from Kyiv
People murdered in Russia
Russian monarchists